The following lists events that happened during 2005 in Algeria.

Incumbents
 President: Abdelaziz Bouteflika
 Prime Minister: Ahmed Ouyahia

Events

June 28, 2005 (Tuesday)
 Islamic Studies dropped from secondary school curriculum. (Arabic News)
 Six Yemeni guerrillas killed in Algeria last week (UPI)

June 27, 2005 (Monday)
 Algeria refuses entry to four Moroccan journalists working for the Moroccan Sahara Foundation NGO, expelling them to Rome.  The move follows increased Morocco-Algeria tensions over the Western Sahara. (Al-Jazeera)

June 26, 2005 (Sunday)
 Joint US-Algerian naval exercises, codenamed "Barbary Thunder", involving such vessels as the USS Nashville. (JPost)
 General Electric announces plans to build Africa's largest water desalination plant to supply Algiers. (Al-Bawaba)

June 25, 2005 (Saturday)
 Amari Saifi ("Abderrezak el-Para), a leading member of the GSPC captured in Chad in October 2004, is sentenced to life imprisonment by a court in Algiers.  He failed to turn up to his trial, sparking speculation. (Reuters) (Al-Jazeera)

June 24, 2005 (Friday)
 Enforcement of the 2002 partnership agreement between Algeria and the European Union to begin on September 1st, says EU source. (APS)
 Finance Minister Mourad Medelci announces plans to cut foreign debt by $1 billion this year "if the positive financial position of the country continues".  The debt currently stands at $21.4 billion, having fallen 7.7% over 2004. (Reuters)

References

 
Years of the 21st century in Algeria